Michael Luntley (born 1953) is a British philosopher and the Professor of Philosophy at the University of Warwick. He is known for his works on philosophy of thought and Wittgenstein's thought.

Selected books
Language, Logic and Experience, 1988
The Meaning of Socialism, 1989
Reason, Truth and Self, 1995
 Contemporary Philosophy of Thought, Blackwell, 1999
Wittgenstein: Meaning and Judgement, Blackwell, 2003
Wittgenstein: Opening Investigations, Wiley-Blackwell, 2015

References

External links
Michael Luntley at the University of Warwick

British philosophers
Philosophy academics
Living people
Academics of the University of Warwick
1953 births
Wittgensteinian philosophers
Alumni of the University of Oxford